Gabriela Cerrano (born 31 May 1977) is an activist in the Workers' Party (Argentina) who was elected as a provincial senator in Salta Province in November 2013.

In 2014 Cerrano intervened in a legal dispute over whether a 14-year-old girl raped and beaten by her stepfather was entitled to have an abortion.  Cerrano went to the hospital where she was being held and demanded her transfer to another hospital  to carry out the abortion.

External links 

interview shortly after her election

Living people
Workers' Party (Argentina) politicians
People from Salta Province
21st-century Argentine women politicians
21st-century Argentine politicians
1977 births
Women's rights in Argentina